Show Me the Right Way is the second studio album by New Zealand recording artist Annabel Fay. The album was released on April 11, 2011 through Siren Records.

Chart performance

Show Me the Right Way entered the New Zealand Top 40 Albums chart and peaked at #8 on April 18, 2011. The album spent a total of 5 weeks on the chart and is currently Fay's highest chart-placing album to date.

Track listing

Notes
Track 8, "Steal Away" contains a sample of the recording "Steal Away Tonight" as performed by Barbara McNair.
Track 10, "Spooky" is a cover of the 1967 version performed by Classics IV.

References

2011 albums
Annabel Fay albums
Albums produced by Greg Haver